Azoarcus olearius is a species of bacteria. It is a nitrogen-fixing bacteria. Its cells are Gram-negative, motile and rod-shaped, surrounded by a thin capsule. Its type strain is DQS-4T (=BCRC 80407T =KCTC 23918T =LMG 26893T).

References

Further reading

Whitman, William B., et al., eds. Bergey's manual® of systematic bacteriology. Vol. 2. Springer, 2012.

External links
LPSN
Type strain of Azoarcus olearius at BacDive -  the Bacterial Diversity Metadatabase

Rhodocyclaceae
Bacteria described in 2013